Steady change is the persistent process of transformation in a capitalist economic system. 

This is explained by the continuous generation, diffusion, accumulation and substitution of innovations by economic agents as time moves on. This regular (and accelerating) phenomenon causes movement and crises in economic structures as measured by rates of growth of countries, regions, sectors and companies. 

The economy is an evolving system. It is thus to always unfold and change, to incessantly show novel behaviour, to surprise its actors and observers with emergent phenomena. The concept stands in contrast to the conventional concept of "steady-state" in economics and is inspired by evolutionary insights in modern economic theory such as put forward by Nelson and Winter's book of 1982.

Further reading
 W. Brian Arthur, Steven N. Durlauf and David A. Lane, ed. (1997), The Economy as an Evolving Complex System II, Reading, Mass.: Addison-Wesley. 
 Francisco Louçã and Sandro Mendonça (2002), "Steady change: The 200 largest US manufacturing firms throughout the twentieth century", Industrial & Corporate Change, vol. 11, no. 4, pp. 817–45.
 Richard R. Nelson and Sidney G. Winter (1982), An evolutionary Theory of Economic Change, Cambridge, Mass.: Harvard University Press. 

Capitalism
Emergence